Rosa Mayreder (née Obermeyer; 30 November 1858, in Vienna – 19 January 1938, in Vienna) was an Austrian freethinker, author, painter, musician and feminist. She was the daughter of Marie and Franz Arnold Obermayer who was a wealthy restaurant operator and barkeeper.

Rosa had twelve brothers and sisters and although her conservative father did not believe in the formal education of girls he allowed her to participate in the Greek and Latin lessons of one of her brothers. She also received private instruction in French, painting and the piano.

Life and marriage 
Rosa Obermeyer was born on 30 November 1858. Her father was Franz Arnold Obermayer, who was the owner of a prosperous tavern. Accounts of Mayreder's family, social atmosphere, and insights to her personality are recorded in a series of diary entries, the first of which is dated 28 April 1873; she was fourteen at the time. Her autobiographical diary entries covered a range of topics from her every-day life to her feelings on war. 

Growing up, Mayreder lived in a large household and received an education that was typical of the well-off. Mayreder was taught to play the piano, sing, speak French, and draw by private tutors. However, Mayreder was jealous that her less academically inclined brothers were given more educational opportunities. Later, the impact of this schooling would become evident, as Mayreder would revolt against the way girls were educated among the middle class. She criticized the sexual double standard and prostitution. At seventy, in 1928, she was recognized as an honorary citizen in Vienna. One such instance of rebellion was her decision to never wear a corset when she turned eighteen. This act of defiance was not only a social statement, but a personal dig against her mother, who believed it was a woman's duty to derive her sense of self from her husband and sons.

As she grew into adulthood, Mayreder was exposed to a plethora of artists, writers, and philosophers. One of the most influential activities on Mayreder's future were her frequent meetings with Josef Storck, Wiener Kunstgewebeschule, Rudolf von Waldheim, Friedrich Eckstein, and her brothers Karl, Julius, and Rudolf. Additionally, the writings of Nietzsche, Goethe, and Kant had a significant influence on her as well. Her exposure to people such as these allowed Mayreder to come in contact with those who acknowledged the discrepancies between men and women in society and encouraged her to pursue involvement in the sociological issues she believed in.

In 1881 Rosa married the architect Karl Mayreder, who later became rector of the technical university in Vienna. The marriage was harmonious but remained childless. In 1883 Rosa had an abortion and she also had two affairs, which she describes in detail in her diaries. Karl suffered repeated depressions from 1912 until his death in 1935.

Feminism, writing, and art 

Rosa Mayreder was a radical critic of the patriarchal structures of the society as well as a critic of feminism. Throughout her adult life, Rosa Mayreder expressed her frustration with the lack of authentic expression for women throughout history. A good deal of her critiques of the society aimed at reforming the imbalance between men and women and expanding the roles which women could take up and be engaged in more generally. Mayreder considered fighting for the rights of women to be her calling in life, and she was aware that her attempts at fighting the status quo were ground-breaking for her time. While she was accused of being "bluestocking," or misbehaved, she continued to openly criticize her environment.

Mayreder published two influential works, one being Zur Kritik der Weiblichkeit (To Critics of Femininity) in 1905 (later published in English as A Survey of the Woman Problem in 1912). This was a collection of essays that refuted quotes from "accepted" philosophers and established authoritative support, a style of writing that was inspired by the ideals of the seventeenth and eighteenth centuries. Her inspiration for writing A Survey of the Women Problem steamed from her belief that the basis of the women's movement was caused by three issues: economic, social, and ethical-psychological sources. Mayreder's second influential publication was Geschlecht und Kultur (Sex and Culture) (1923). The latter work, which criticized the double standard and discrimination against women, was translated into English. She also published an autobiography, Das Haus in der Landskrongasse.

During World War I Mayreder published articles and reports in which she advocated a pacifist approach in various media outlets, including Neues Frauenleben and Internationale Rundschau.

In addition to writing, Mayreder took a liking for painting and became the first woman admitted to the Aquarellist club. In 1981, one of her watercolors was accepted as an exhibition at the annual Viennese Kunstlerhaus (House of Artists). Furthermore, Mayreder founded the Kunstchule for Frauen und Madchen (Art School for Girls and Women) with Olga Prager, Marriane Hainisch, and Karl Federn.

Rosa Mayreder was one of the founding members of the General Austrian Women's Association. She met Rudolf Steiner (with whom she entered into a long and extensive correspondence) through women's rights campaigner Marie Lang. She also met Hugo Wolf and Friedrich Eckstein. Rosa formed a warm friendship with Wolf and developed one of her stories as the libretto for his opera Der Corregidor, which was first performed in Mannheim in 1896. During these years she published her first novel Aus meiner Jugend (From My Youth). It was also in Lang's circle that Rosa met Marianne Hainisch with whom she worked in the Austrian women's association "Allgemeiner Österreichischer Frauenverein", which was formed in 1902.

Rosa Mayreder was the only female founding member of the Sociological Association of Vienna which was initiated in 1907. During the First World War Mayreder engaged in the peace movement and became in 1919 the chairman of the "Internationale Frauenliga für Frieden und Freiheit" (International Women's League for Peace and Liberty, IFFF).

Mayreder was an influence on Swedish literary critic Klara Johanson.

Rosa Mayreder and Nietzsche’s philosophy 
In her early publications on various social issues such as feminism and public health, Mayreder was enthusiastically appreciative of the work of Nietzsche. In her later writings in the late 1920s, Mayreder became more critical of Nietzsche’s writings as well as the excesses of the emerging cult around Nietzsche’s philosophy; however, she did not abandon her overall appreciation of Nietzsche.

Books 
Source:

 Askese Und Erotik (Asceticism and Eroticism)
 Idole (Idol)

References

External links 

 Rosa Mayreder 
 

1858 births
1938 deaths
Austrian feminists
Austrian women musicians
19th-century Austrian painters
20th-century Austrian painters
20th-century Austrian women artists
Austrian women writers
Austrian women painters
Feminist artists
Feminist musicians
Musicians from Vienna